Michal Hrivňák (born 5 March 1991) is a Slovak football goalkeeper.

Club career
Hrivňák signed for Brescia in 2011; however he failed to make any appearances for the first team, instead playing a number of matches for their reserve squad. For the remainder of the 2011–12 season, he was loaned out to Serie C1 side Civitanovese.

In July 2012, Hrivňák joined Scottish First Division team Dunfermline Athletic on a one-year deal after impressing in a pre-season friendly against Scottish Third Division side Berwick Rangers. He made his first-team debut in December 2012 against Livingston, replacing injured first-choice keeper Paul Gallacher. In March 2013, with Dunfermline in administration and having released a number of players, including Gallacher, Hrivňák was promoted to first-choice keeper and played in the 2–2 draw against Livingston. From that on, Hrivňák was featured as a first-choice goalkeeper throughout the season and the club was relegated. In August, Hrivňák left Dunfermline Athletic by mutual consent after spending time on the bench ahead of the 2013–14 season and was replaced by loanee goalkeeper Ryan Scully. According to manager Jim Jefferies, Hrivňák's departure was due to not settling well.

Following his release from Dunfermline Athletic, Hrivňák returned to his homeland by signing for Spartak Trnava.

References

External links
 
 Profile at dafc.co.uk
 

Living people
1991 births
Dunfermline Athletic F.C. players
Association football goalkeepers
Slovak footballers
Scottish Football League players
English Football League players
Sportspeople from Rimavská Sobota